Kaewatine is a village in the northeast of Maré Island, in the Loyalty Islands of New Caledonia. It lies east by road from Thogone and north of Menaku.

References

Populated places in Maré Island